'Amr ibn Imru' al-Qays was the third Lakhmid king of al-Hirah, reigning in 328–363. A son of the famed Imru' al-Qays ibn 'Amr who had defected to the Roman Empire, he returned to Sassanid allegiance.

His mother was Mariya al-Barriyah, a sister of the Ghassanid king Tha'laba ibn 'Amr. 'Amr was very active in the wars of his Sassanid Persian overlords against the Romans, and was even nicknamed "warmonger" for the wars he engaged in. In 337 AD the Persian shah Shapur II harassed the Roman borders and commissioned the Arabs to attack and invade as well.

References

Arab Christians in Mesopotamia
Lakhmid kings
4th-century monarchs in the Middle East
People of the Roman–Sasanian Wars
4th-century Arabs
Vassal rulers of the Sasanian Empire
Arabs from the Sasanian Empire